Paul Victor may refer to:

 Paul S. Victor (born 1965), American guitarist, singer and songwriter
 Paul Ben-Victor (born 1965), American actor
 Paul-Émile Victor (1907–1995), French ethnologist and explorer
 Paul Victor (footballer) (born 1984), Dominican footballer

See also